Matthew 9:22 is a verse in the ninth chapter of the Gospel of Matthew in the New Testament.

Content
In the original Greek according to Westcott-Hort for this verse is:
Ὁ δὲ Ἰησοῦς ἐπιστραφεὶς καὶ ἰδὼν αὐτὴν εἶπε, Θάρσει, θύγατερ· ἡ πίστις σου σέσωκέ σε. Καὶ ἐσώθη ἡ γυνὴ ἀπὸ τῆς ὥρας ἐκείνης.  

In the King James Version of the Bible the text reads:
But Jesus turned him about, and when he saw her, he said, Daughter, be of good comfort; thy faith hath made thee whole. And the woman was made whole from that hour.

The New International Version translates the passage as:
Jesus turned and saw her. "Take heart, daughter," he said, "your faith has healed you." And the woman was healed from that moment.

Analysis
Witham states that the woman's faith is attributed as the cause of the healing, in that she believed that by touching his garment she might be saved. Witham also notes that interestingly Jesus turns about and looks, as if he were ignorant and wanted to see who touched him. From the different gospel accounts, it isn't clear if she was healed upon Jesus' words or the moment she touched his garment.

Commentary from the Church Fathers
Rabanus Maurus: "What is this that He bids her, Be of good cheer, seeing if she had not had faith, she would not have sought healing of Him? He requires of her strength and perseverance, that she may come to a sure and certain salvation."

Chrysostom: "Or because the woman was fearful, therefore He said, Be of good cheer. He calls her daughter, for her faith had made her such."

Jerome: "He said not, Thy faith shall make thee whole, but, hath made thee whole; for in that thou hast believed, thou art already made whole."

Chrysostom: "She had not yet a perfect mind respecting Christ, or she would not have supposed that she could be hid from Him; but Christ would not suffer her to go away unobserved, not that He sought fame, but for many reasons. First, He relieves the woman’s fear, that she should not be pricked in her conscience as though she had stolen this boon; secondly, He corrects her error in supposing she could be hid from Him; thirdly, He displays her faith to all for their imitation; and fourthly, He did a miracle, in that He showed He knew all things, no less than in drying the fountain of her blood. It follows, And the woman was made whole from that hour."

Glossa Ordinaria: "This must be understood as the time in which she touched the hem of His garment, not in which Jesus turned to her; for she was already healed, as the other Evangelists testify, and as may be inferred from the Lord’s words."

Hilary of Poitiers: "Herein is to be observed the marvellous virtue of the Lord, that the power that dwelt in His body should give healing to things perishable, and the heavenly energy extended even through the hems of His garments; for God is not comprehensible that He should be shut in by a body. For His taking a body unto Him did not confine His power, but His power took upon it a frail body for our redemption. Figuratively, this ruler is to be understood as the Law, which prays the Lord that He would restore life to the dead multitude which it had brought up for Christ, preaching that His coming was to be looked for."

Rabanus Maurus: "Or; The ruler of the synagogue signifies Moses; he is named Jairus, ‘illuminating,’ or, ‘that shall illuminate,’ because he received the words of life to give to us, and by them enlightens all, being himself enlightened by the Holy Spirit. The daughter of the ruler, that is, the synagogue itself, being as it were in the twelfth year of its age, that is, in the season of puberty, when it should have borne spiritual progeny to God, fell into the sickness of error. While then the Word of God is hastening to this ruler's daughter to make whole the sons of Israel, a holy Church is gathered from among the Gentiles, which while it was perishing by inward corruption, received by faith that healing that was prepared for others. It should be noted, that the ruler's daughter was twelve years old, and this woman had been twelve years afflicted; thus she had begun to be diseased at the very time the other was born; so in one and the same age the synagogue had its birth among the Patriarchs, and the nations without began to be polluted with the pest of idolatry. For the issue of blood may be taken in two ways, either for the pollution of idolatry, or for obedience to the pleasures of flesh and blood. Thus as long as the synagogue flourished, the Church languished; the falling away of the first was made the salvation of the Gentiles. Also the Church draws nigh and touches the Lord, when it approaches Him in faith. She believed, spake her belief, and touched, for by these three things, faith, word, and deed, all salvation is gained. She came behind Him, as He spake, If any one serve me, let him follow me; (John 12:26.) or because, not having seen the Lord present in the flesh, when the sacraments of His incarnation were fulfilled, she came at length to the grace of the knowledge of Him. Thus also she touched the hem of His garment, because the Gentiles, though they had not seen Christ in the flesh, received the tidings of His incarnation. The garment of Christ is put for the mystery of His incarnation, wherewith His Deity is clothed; the hem of His garment are the words that hang upon His incarnation. She touches not the garment, but the hem thereof; because she saw not the Lord in the flesh, but received the word of the incarnation through the Apostles. Blessed is he that touches but the uttermost part of the word by faith. She is healed while the Lord is not in the city, but while He is yet on the way; as the Apostles cried, Because ye judge yourselves unworthy of eternal life, lo, we turn to the Gentiles. (Acts 13:46.) And from the time of the Lord's coming the Gentiles began to be healed."

References

External links
Other translations of Matthew 9:22 at BibleHub

09:22